Adenophorea or Aphasmidia was a class of nematodes (roundworms). It has been by and large abandoned by modern taxonomy, because there is strong evidence for it being a motley paraphyletic group of unrelated lineages of roundworms.

Characteristics supposed to distinguish Adenophorea are:
 amphids always post-labial,  shape, pore-like to elaborate
 deirids are not seen
 phasmids are generally absent
 hypodermal glands present (excretory?) uninucleate
 simple non-tubular excretory system when present
 three caudal glands commonly opening through a spinneret at the tail tip
 male generally has two testes
 caudal alae are rare
 male with supplement glands in a single ventro-median row
 sensory papillae in cephalic region and along the body
 generally there are five esophageal glands
 marine, freshwater, terrestrial

As it seems, a number of these traits are plesiomorphic, and thus unsuitable to discern relationships.

Footnotes

References 

  (2002): Nematoda. Version of 2002-JAN-01. Retrieved 2008-NOV-02.

Nematode taxa
Obsolete animal taxa
Protostome classes
Paraphyletic groups